Shinpei Takagi may refer to:

 Shinpei Takagi (actor, born 1985) (高木心平), Japanese actor
 Shinpei Takagi (actor, born 1902) (高木新平), Japanese actor